The 1978 Hawaii gubernatorial election was Hawaii's sixth gubernatorial election.  The election was held on November 7, 1978, and resulted in a victory for the Democratic candidate, Governor George Ariyoshi over Republican candidate, State Senator John R. Leopold and three other candidates.  Ariyoshi received more votes than any other candidate in every county in the state.

Primaries
Primary elections were held on October 7, 1978.

Democratic Primary
Candidates and primary votes:
George Ariyoshi, governor: 50.30%
Frank Fasi, Mayor of Honolulu: 48.91%
Billy Kuaiwa: 0.53%
Valentine Huihui: 0.26%

Republican Primary
Candidates and primary votes:
John R. Leopold, state senator: 91.56%
Valentine K. Wessel: 4.88%
Gabriel Juarez: 3.56%

Nonpartisan Primary
Candidates and primary votes:
Alema Leota: 58.85%
Frank Pore: 41.15%

General election

References

1978
1978 United States gubernatorial elections
November 1978 events in the United States
1978 Hawaii elections